The Shulamite, also known as The Folly of Desire, a 1915 British silent drama film directed by George Loane Tucker and starring Norman McKinnel, Manora Thew and Gerald Ames. It is based on the 1906 play of the same name by Edward Knoblock. Prints and/or fragments were found in the Dawson Film Find in 1978.

Cast
 Norman McKinnel as Simeon Knollett  
 Manora Thew as Deborah  
 Gerald Ames as Robert Waring  
 Mary Dibley as Joan Waring  
 Gwynne Herbert as Mrs. Waring  
 Minna Grey as Tanta Anna  
 Bert Wynne as Jan Van Kennel  
 Lewis Gilbert
 Beryl Mercer

References

Bibliography
 Goble, Alan. The Complete Index to Literary Sources in Film. Walter de Gruyter, 1999.

External links

1915 films
1915 drama films
British silent feature films
British drama films
Films directed by George Loane Tucker
British films based on plays
British black-and-white films
1910s English-language films
1910s British films
Silent drama films